= Mincle Mountain =

Mountain in Georgia, United States

Coordinates: 34.5208°N 83.8638°W

Mincle Mountain is a summit in the U.S. state of Georgia. The elevation is 1,870 feet (570 m).

A variant name is "Mincie Mountain". The name is a corruption of "Mincey", the name of a local pioneer family.
